Gheorghe Covaciu (born 8 July 1957) is a Romanian former handball player who won a bronze medal at the 1984 Summer Olympics. At the club level he played for Dinamo Bucharest, HC Minaur Baia Mare, Benfica and Sporting CP as well as BM Ciudad Real in Spain, before finishing his career in Germany and becoming a coach.

References

1957 births
Living people
Romanian male handball players
People from Buzău 
S.L. Benfica handball players
Handball players at the 1984 Summer Olympics
Olympic handball players of Romania
Olympic bronze medalists for Romania
Olympic medalists in handball
Medalists at the 1984 Summer Olympics